Mano is a town in Sierra Leone.

References 

Populated places in Sierra Leone